Seth Edward Putnam (May 15, 1968 – June 11, 2011) was an American musician best known as the founder, vocalist and occasional guitarist of grindcore band Anal Cunt. He was known for his high-pitched screamed vocals and lyrics that either shock, offend, or invoke morbid humor. Throughout his career, Putnam was also involved in numerous side projects.

Biography

Early years 
Putnam was born on May 15, 1968, in Newton, Massachusetts, to Edward R. Putnam and Barbara Ann Donohue. He was of quarter English and quarter Irish descent. His parents are divorced. Seth was married to his first wife, Alison Dunn, from December 1998 through June 2001. He married Julie, his second wife, on May 17, 2008. From 1986 to 1988, Putnam played bass in the thrash metal band Executioner. He also owned his own record label called "Wicked Sick Records", and had a subsidiary label called "Stridecore Records" that only had one release which was Anal Cunt's The 5,643 Song EP.

Personality 
Despite his shock humor and turbulent lifestyle, Putnam was often described by fans and peers as a warm, intelligent, and sensitive person. Putnam saw himself as a comedian and used music as an outlet.

In school, classmates who knew Putnam described him as intelligent and stern, but unmotivated, apathetic and often an underwhelming student. Putnam skipped a grade in school and became a very bright student, tutoring his classmates. In his own words, Putnam often blamed brutal fights with Catholic school nuns for helping to shape his cynical personality. When he reached high school, he had lost interest in excelling in education or academics, becoming more of a slacker and underachiever. By the time he had graduated school, Putnam had left the Catholic religion in which he was raised. After graduation, Putnam showed no interest in attending college or university.

Putnam also made up his own religion when he was a child. His all-time favorite bands were Negative Approach and The Village People, his favorite movie was The Bad Bunch.

The 2018 grindcore documentary Slave to the Grind explores Putnam in detail, with his peers expressing the duality of his nature: former bandmates Tim Morse and Scott Hull describe Putnam often being personable and relaxed, but Hull also notes that he'd often get arrested causing trouble on the street. Discordance Axis singer Jon Chang notes that he was really close to Putnam for years, but describes him as a "really disturbed guy" and a "backstabbing piece of shit at the end of his life". Chang also recounted an incident
after a show when Putnam introduced his mother to Chang, he remarked that they had met earlier when he pulled Putnam's mother out from the show's moshpit, causing Putnam to become aggressive and threaten Chang, much to the confusion of everyone present.
Putnam was also good friends with Pantera frontman Philip Anselmo. Anselmo used to get Anal Cunt to open for Pantera whenever they went through Boston. Anal Cunt opened for Pantera three times. There is also footage of Putnam singing "Suicide Note Part II" with Anselmo at a show in 1998.

In 2019, Brutal Truth and Venomous Concept vocalist Kevin Sharp did an interview with Metal Underground and talked about a conversation he had with Seth after his coma. He also said that Putnam was an "encyclopedia of music".

According to Eyehategod vocalist Mike Williams Putnam was a normal guy off-stage and very quiet and soft-spoken. Williams also stated that he used to call Putnam, who he has known since 1988, long distance from the Chevron gas station that he worked at, so that all his calls would be charged to Chevron.

1993 arrest 
On August 26, 1993, Anal Cunt played a show at Nightbreak in San Francisco, California and started their set with their song "Iron Funeral" and played Blur Including New H.C. Song after and during the second song, a woman later identified as Elizabeth Quigley grabbed Putnam's microphone. Putnam then turned around and swung the microphone, hitting Quigley in the face. Anal Cunt members John Kozik, Tim Morse, and Paul Kraynak eventually stopped playing and audience members (including Quigley) started to yell at Putnam, telling him to leave the venue and repeatedly saying "Call the fucking cops!" along with several insults directed towards Putnam, who was eventually arrested and spent the night in a San Francisco jail. He was bailed out the next morning by Kozik. On October 19 of that year, Putnam received a letter from Michael Spadaccini who was Quigley's attorney informing him that a civil action is being filed against him for assault, when Putnam went to court he was found guilty and fined $1200. A video of this show exists and can be found on YouTube, a cassette recording of this show was released on a live 7-inch called "Breaking the Law" which was disguised as a bootleg due to the band's contract with Earache Records. The track after the Nightbreak show is the sound of a jail cell door slamming that was recorded by Yaz who is credited as the "party technician" in the 7-inch while Kozik was bailing Putnam out of jail. Pictures of the letter, Putnam's bail record, and a newspaper clipping of the show on Side B were included in the 7-inch, it also includes liner notes by Robert Williams from Siege.

Drug overdose and coma 
On October 12, 2004, Putnam was hospitalized after ingesting a cocktail of crack cocaine, alcohol, heroin, and two months' worth of Ambien sleeping pills. It has been reported that he spent the previous day contemplating suicide, though exact circumstances surrounding the drug overdose are vague. He was sent to Spaulding Rehab before he woke up from his coma.

Anal Cunt's 1997 album I Like It When You Die contained the track "You're in a Coma". Putnam's reaction to the resulting irony of being in a coma was published in the Boston Phoenix: "Actually, it turned out it was just as gay as the song I wrote nine years ago – being in a coma was just as fuckin' stupid as I wrote it was." Anal Cunt kept performing the song during live shows after the coma, with Putnam sharing anecdotes with the audience before the song.

Prior to his coma in 2004, Putnam overdosed on heroin in 1998. In a 2007 interview, he said: "In 1998 I was dead for 10 minutes from a heroin overdose. The EMT's used that stuff to revive people and it didn't work. They tried it a second time for the hell of it and it worked. All I remember was waking up in my kitchen having no idea where I was.  On the way to the hospital, the EMT told me I was probably going to have brain damage the rest of my life.  By the time I got to the hospital I was completely back to normal though. I didn't see any 'mystic visions' or anything that time either."

Feud with Chris Barnes 
There was friction between Putnam and Six Feet Under vocalist Chris Barnes. According to Putnam's defunct website, Putnam and Josh Martin (Anal Cunt guitarist) went to a Six Feet Under show while they were touring for their first album to hand out fliers looking for a drummer, they eventually heckled Barnes during a Six Feet Under set, Putnam yelled "Ha ha! you got kicked out of Cannibal Corpse!" which lead to an altercation between the three after Six Feet Under finished their set, ending with Six Feet Under's roadies ganging up on Putnam and Martin grabbing Barnes' wrists before Barnes fled to his tour bus and hid there. Putnam released the song "Chris Barnes Is a Pussy" as retaliation to the incident in 1999. According to Putnam in an interview with Capital Chaos TV several years later, Six Feet Under went out of their way to avoid playing in the same city as Anal Cunt several years after the incident. Putnam stated "I guess he (Chris Barnes) is still afraid of me". Despite the feud, Putnam eventually became a fan of Six Feet Under and stated that "Murdered in the Basement" was his favorite song by Six Feet Under. Martin also said that Putnam saw Cannibal Corpse live on their Eaten Back To Life tour.

Hatebreed incident 
Anal Cunt were booked to play at the second New England Metal and Hardcore Festival in 2000. Misfits headlined the main stage, Anal Cunt headlined the second stage and Hatebreed headlined the Commercial Street Cafe. Problems arose when the Hatebreed set was shut down due to problems with the sound system, so security moved Hatebreed to Anal Cunt's stage, and set them up to play before them. This apparently upset the audience that were expecting to see Anal Cunt, and according to Josh Martin, vocalist Jamey Jasta got angry and called the crowd a bunch of "washed up metalheads" and allegedly claimed that Hatebreed were more popular and sold more records than Anal Cunt. Putnam and Martin were at the bar next door not knowing what was going on, but returned by the time the Hatebreed set was over to see that Putnam was yelled at by Jasta. A melee then ensued. Martin who owned a VHS tape of the fight (which ended up getting lost) claimed that Putnam was standing 20 feet away watching the melee ensue. Putnam was arrested by the end of the night, along with his wife.

In February 2021, Jamey Jasta interviewed Jimmy Bower from Eyehategod on his podcast "The Jasta Show". Jasta mentioned a story where Putnam requested a mop to make sure the stage was clean because people were skating on it and eventually ended up attacking the audience with it instead. He also said he used to distro Anal Cunt's albums and book their shows. Bower told stories of Putnam using a fire extinguisher on stage and getting foam all over Eyehategod's gear.

Death 
On June 11, 2011, Putnam died of a suspected heart attack at the age of 43. He is buried at Newton Cemetery in Newton, Massachusetts.

Side projects and former bands

Angry Hate 
The idea of the band came up when Putnam and Larry Lifeless (Kilslug vocalist) were drunk one night watching Jerry Springer and Larry said "That guy looks like he should be in an old punk band called Angry Hate or something". The first recording was in January 1999 of Larry hammering a fence against some lady's garage which was put on at the end of the song, "M.P." on the first release. That summer, they recorded four songs, all of which were old Sickness songs. "Blinking Blue Lights" was actually recorded by Kilslug, but never released. The other songs originally by the Sickness were never released. They made another EP called Bad Mood that had a certain number of copies pressed but were never officially released. Putnam and Lee Suniga (owner of Menace to Sobriety Records) sold them on eBay. Angry Hate performed two live shows in March and April 2002. In 2004 they recorded a song called "Satan Wins" with Paulie Kraynak on bass but it hasn't been released.

Satan's Warriors 
Satan's Warriors started in February 1986 after Putnam and his friends made up a fake death metal fanzine with fake band names as a joke. Putnam eventually admitted to doing it in April of that year. There was an opening for a band to play live over the radio, so Putnam got a lineup together and made a four-song demo with him on drums and vocals, and his cousin Drew on guitar. Their final show was in July 1988. They were supposed to get back together in 2003 and re-record some songs written between 1986 and 1988. The lineup was supposed to be with Putnam on guitar and vocals, Paulie Kraynak on second guitar, and John Gillis on drums.

Impaled Northern Moonforest 
In early 1997, Putnam and Josh Martin came up with the idea of starting a joke black metal band and decided to record a demo. They didn't use actual drums because someone was sleeping in the room next to them, so Martin played his acoustic guitar while Putnam did vocals and percussion by slapping his leg and a mattress. They did a few shows and sold copies of their first demo. The titles on the demo are different from the ones on the 7-inch vinyl release due to Putnam and Josh losing their copies of the demo and forgetting the titles.

Shit Scum 
Shit Scum formed in 1988 after Putnam saw an ad looking for musicians. Putnam chose to call after seeing Cryptic Slaughter as the only influence as not many people in Boston were into that band. Putnam eventually invited Fred Ordonez to see Satan's Warriors (which was their last show). Anal Cunt was also playing what was supposed to be their last show but Ordonez and his friends never showed up. Putnam did another show with Anal Cunt so Ordonez could see them, while Shit Scum also did their first show on the same day. Putnam was eventually invited to a studio to play bass on their first demo called "Self Mutilation". They later did a show in January, 1990. Putnam and Ordonez (without Wayne, who was their drummer) went to a studio that college rock bands mainly performed at. The engineer did not like them and tried convincing them to quit. The record was eventually finished and they ended up owing the studio money so the studio kept the master reel.

Anal Cunt did a tour in Germany and performed some Shit Scum covers. Matthias Weigand (head of Ecocentric Records) liked the cover of the song "Shit Scum" and wanted to put out a 7-inch. Putnam called the studio and asked about the reel. The guy on the phone said "it's right here, pick it up whenever you want", not knowing they owed money to the studio. Putnam mixed all the songs and sent them to Ecocentric Records. Ordonez never had a cover for the record so Weigand made one up. The record was eventually called "Manson Is Jesus". Ordonez wanted the record to be called "I Wish this Record Could Punch You in the Face", and have a fist on the cover. Shit Scum had already broken up by the time the album was released.

Full Blown A.I.D.S. 
Full Blown A.I.D.S. started in 1997 while Putnam was jamming with his friend and cousin. In 1998, he wrote some songs and recorded a demo of "No One Cares" with Nate Linehan on drums. In 2002 he moved to Texas for a while but eventually moved back to Boston. In 2003 the band went into the studio and recorded some songs and mixed them in a day. They eventually put out two EPs and a compilation CD in 2008, with both EPs and the song "Throwing Cars at People on Coke with Thor". In 2010 the band released a live album with some bonus tracks called "Viral Load" which would eventually be their last ever release and the only release with Josh Randall on drums.

Death's Head Quartet 
The Death's Head Quartet was a jazz/noise improvisational band that featured Putnam on bass and vocals, Chris Joyce on guitar, Robert Williams on drums, and Jim Hobbs on saxophone. Their first release was called "Live on the Joint" which was a radio broadcast from November 1, 2001. Their second release was recorded on April 9, 2001, and was not released until 2003.

Cuntsaw 
Cuntsaw started in 1989 with Putnam on vocals and guitar and Tim Morse on drums. They usually practiced after Anal Cunt shows. They did one demo called "Concerned" and did one show at Brandeis University with Fred Ordonez on second guitar. They eventually broke up. The Anal Cunt song "Foreplay with a Tree Shredder" was originally a Cuntsaw song that was named "Hell Bent for Hitler".

You're Fired 
You're Fired started in 2002. Within two months they had a nine-song demo recorded which eventually became the Warning EP and was released in 2002. After Putnam died, they made an EP called The End with Paulie Kraynak on guitar. Most of the riffs were written by Putnam and the album was also recorded with Putnam's Gibson SG, Marshall cabinet and the Ampeg SS-140C amplifier head borrowed from Paulie Kraynak that was also used on the Warning EP. The End was released in 2012 on vinyl and it also can be purchased on BandCamp along with the Warning EP. The song "Throw It Off" from their last EP was originally an Anal Cunt song with different lyrics.

Adolf Satan 
Adolf Satan started in 2002 after Upsidedown Cross broke up. Putnam played drums for the band for a brief period of time. He eventually quit and Nate Linehan joined. They recorded a demo in 2003 and eventually made a self-titled studio album. They recorded another demo in 2006 before breaking up two years later.

Upsidedown Cross 
Upsidedown Cross started in 1989 after Larry Lifeless' band "Kilslug" had a violent breakup. The first lineup featured Larry (vocals), Cheez (bass), and Scott Vangel (guitar) who went by "Shoehorn" in the band. Taang! Records thought the band were too insane to deal with, and wouldn't sign them unless Rico Pertoleum (ex-Kilslug) was in the band, he was kicked out after the songwriting for the first record was done. J. Mascis from Dinosaur Jr. filled in on drums for the first album. Throughout the 90's they had different lineup changes and had a few more releases. Seth Putnam ended up joining them on guitar and did one show with them which also turned out to be the band's last show before they eventually broke up, Seth ended up moving to Texas. There were plans to get the band back together with Josh Martin on guitar. According to Josh, Cheez wasn't in any state to be playing an instrument, so he ended up starting Adolf Satan instead. When Seth moved back to Boston him and Josh became the two guitarists for the band, Seth ended up quitting the band in March 2003. Seth and Josh never recorded anything with the band despite Seth being credited on their split with Sloth, Cheez decided to put out an old recording and credit the lineup they had at the time. In 2011 Upsidedown Cross became a two-piece with Seth on drums and Larry on vocals and guitar. Some rehearsal footage exists of the band.

Executioner
Post Mortem
Siege

P.O.D.D.A. (Pile of Drunks & Drug Addicts) 
Not much is known about this band but they had only one recording session in 2007 which eventually surfaced onto YouTube, the band had Putnam on vocals, Dejan Podobnik(Patareni, Millions of Dead Cops...) on drums and Chomi on guitar. Mickey Offender from D.R.I., Offenders,  was supposed to lay a bass track but it never happened.

Sirhan Sirhan 
This band started in December 1990 and Putnam and Tim Morse were trying to think of a Christmas gift for Mike Mahan who recently moved to Indiana, they recorded a demo and got a band picture in a $2 photo booth. They sent it to Mike who eventually lost his copy, the demo was released as a split album with Cuntsaw.

Insult 
Insult started in 1992 as a four piece (Derek only did vocals at the time) and decided to record an album in 1997 after releasing a few demo tapes, it was going horribly for them so they got Putnam to come in and produce their album, the album was called "I Wanna Be a Burn Victim", Putnam eventually became their bass player and did a west coast tour with them in 1998 along with a split 7-inch with Ruido and a live show over the radio which was released on a split with Anal Cunt, both the 7-inch and the live split were released in 1999. Putnam quit the same year.

Person Killer 
Person Killer was a one-man project Putnam started around 1995, he made a demo and sent it to Earache Records along with a T-shirt, a pin, and a letter that didn't reveal the sender's name. It was planned to be released on a two LP set called "The Worst of Seth Putnam" but it hasn't been released.

Vaginal Jesus 
Speculation circulated as to whether or not Putnam was a member of the white power grindcore/hardcore band Vaginal Jesus, after Putnam stated that he was just a friend of the band. However, he later retracted this claim and admitted to being a member.

The Losers 
Before Putnam started Anal Cunt in March 1988, he had various bands that sounded like Anal Cunt. The earliest one he could remember was The Losers, who started in 1980. The band featured Putnam doing vocals and playing a toy guitar (he could not afford a real one at the time) and his cousin Michael who played cardboard boxes as fast as possible. That band's name was eventually changed to "Noise". Putnam eventually got a real guitar and made more tapes.

George H Brown 
George H Brown was a blues rock band that originally featured Putnam on guitar, Mike Mahan on bass, Fred Ordonez on second guitar, Tim Morse on drums, and John McCarthy on vocals. Putnam eventually got frustrated with the band and broke it up. They got back together years later with Putnam doing guitar and vocals, Paulie Kraynak on bass and Josh Randall (FUKK/Full Blown A.I.D.S live drummer) on drums. A Myspace page was made for the band and there were plans to release a debut CD.

From Sloth to Anger 
Putnam and John Kozik started a band called "Sloth" but changed the name to "From Sloth to Anger" after finding out there was a band called Sloth in New York. The band name was taken from an inner sleeve of a Borbetomagus record. The band went nowhere and only made one tape that nobody has heard. After this, they broke up. Tim Morse had a baby on the way and Mike Mahan moved to Indiana for six months, Putnam and Tim got Anal Cunt back together with Fred Ordonez on guitar.

Raging Death 
In October 2021, Tim Morse did an interview on the Death Metal podcast. He mentioned Putnam having a band with his cousin called "Raging Death". Putnam did the percussion on an old plastic bank of the comic book character "The Thing" while his cousin played guitar. Since the demo was not released officially, the only song title that Morse revealed was "Rabbit Axe".

Planned project with Mike Williams 
In 2004 Putnam and Mike Williams from Eyehategod got the idea of starting a band and writing a record with all "anti-cop songs" after e-mailing each other about their recent troubles with the police. A variety of riffs were written that were described as "Venom meets The Germs", but due to Williams being arrested and Putnam's eventual death no material was ever recorded and the idea for the band dissolved.

Ondskap 
In 2002 Seth started Ondskap with a guy from Norway who also helped him run his website, there were plans for them to record music for a three-way split CD with two other unknown bands.

Unnamed Al Stewart cover band 
Seth had plans to start an Al Stewart cover band with former members of the bands Slapshot and Stompbox, it is unknown if this band ever happened.

Cannibal Hitler 
Not much info exists on this band, they have one known cassette release on Wicked Sick Records (Putnam's label) called "Don't Worry It's All Grindcore" which came out in 1989.

Screaming Gore Guts 
Screaming Gore Guts was one of Putnam's pre-Anal Cunt noise bands. They started in 1985 and they did a demo called "We Are Fucking God". The lineup was Seth and 2 of his friends named Luke and Ken who also ran a fanzine called "Frightmare". They played one show in Seth's parents' living room, after that show ended the members of the band were chased home by an angry mob. The band never did anything since then but after Putnam's passing in 2011, the demo eventually surfaced on a now-defunct blog and in 2022 it surfaced onto YouTube.

Seven Minutes of Nausea 
Seven Minutes of Nausea started in 1985 with Mick Hollows on vocals and Scut on drums and bass. In 1990, the group split up and Mick Hollows moved to Europe and continued the band as a one man band that collaborated with many of his friends. Putnam played drums on their "Disobediant Loser" EP and Fred Ordonez (credited as "Fred Kase") who used to be in Anal Cunt played guitar on the same EP along with Matthias Weigand playing bass. Weigand also owns "Ecocentric Records" which is a German D.I.Y. label that released material from Putnam's bands such as the "Manson Is Jesus" EP by Shit Scum, the Psycho/Satan's Warriors split 7-inch, a compilation called "Killed by the Machinery of Sorrow" which has two Shit Scum songs and a Post Mortem song, and the "Fast Boston HC" CD by Anal Cunt. Weigand and Hollows are the remaining members of the band, they are now based in Koblenz, Germany.

Excretion 
Excretion was a band that featured Anal Cunt's original lineup except Seth played guitar and Mike Mahan played a one string bass guitar.

Avant garde band with original Anal Cunt lineup 
The name for this band is currently unknown, it featured Seth Putnam on drums, Tim Morse on guitar, and Mike Mahan doing poetry. The only song that was revealed was a 45 minute song called "I Went To The Store".

Leigh Putnam 
This band featured Seth on backing vocals, Josh Martin on guitar and Nate Linehan on drums. They did a CD in 1998 called "Branscombe Richmond" and only 2 copies exist.

Bands he filled in or did a guest appearance for 
Adolf Satan (bass and drums at several live performances)
Bad Mouthed Bandits (guitar studio session)
Bratface (guitar at two live performances)
Eyehategod (vocals at Mardi Gras 1996 show and one other show)
Fear of God (drums at one live performance)
Flächenbrand (drums at one song at one live performance)
Haggis (vocal duet with Wattie Buchan from The Exploited on the song "A Calling to Arms")
Kilslug (guitar at two live performances)
Necrophiliacs (bass at one live performance)
Nightstick (vocals at two live performances)
Boredoms
Brutal Truth
Corrosion of Conformity
Graveyard BBQ
Incantation
Napalm Death
Nasty Disaster
Padded Hell
Pantera (in 1996, Putnam did guest vocals on The Great Southern Trendkill for their songs "The Great Southern Trendkill", "War Nerve", "13 Steps to Nowhere", and "Suicide Note Pt. II").
Psycho (he always sang their song "Group Pressure" with them)
P.T.L. Klub
Scissorfight
Slapshot (additional vocals on some songs on the "Live At SO36" album, also appears in their "Live In Germany 1993" VHS)
The Ruins
Thor (vocals and guitar on the song "Throwing Cars at People on Coke with Thor)
Today Is the Day (did vocals on their song "Butterflies")
W.B.I.
Le Scrawl (Additional vocals on the song "Quest")
Proclamation (vocals on the song "Conform" which is also a Siege cover)
Discordance Axis (additional vocals on "Ruin Trajectory" at their show at CBGB's in August, 1995)
Nunslaughter (spoken intro on the "Gruesome" live album)
Deceased (sung a cover of "Black Metal" by Venom with them)

References

External links 
 Impaled Northern Moonforest
 FAQ on wickedsickrecords.com

1968 births
2011 deaths
20th-century American singers
21st-century American singers
American heavy metal singers
American punk rock singers
American heavy metal guitarists
American male guitarists
American male bass guitarists
American multi-instrumentalists
Grindcore musicians
Musicians from Boston
Former Roman Catholics
20th-century American male singers
21st-century American male singers